The Bolivian Records in swimming are the fastest times ever swum by an individual from Bolivia. These records are maintained by Bolivia's national swimming federation: la Federación Boliviana de Natación (FEBONA).

FEBONA keeps records for both for men (varones) and women (damas), for events in long course (50m, Piscina Larga) and short course (25m, Piscina Corta) courses. Records are kept in the following events (by stroke):
freestyle (libre): 50, 100, 200, 400, 800 and 1500;
backstroke (espalda): 50, 100 and 200;
breaststroke (pecho): 50, 100 and 200;
butterfly (mariposa): 50, 100 and 200;
individual medley (combinado): 100 (25m only), 200 and 400;
relays: 4x50 free, 4x100 free, 4x200 free, 4x50 medley, and 4 × 100 medley.

Long course (50m)

Men

|-bgcolor=#DDDDDD
|colspan=9|
|-

|-bgcolor=#DDDDDD
|colspan=9|
|-

|-bgcolor=#DDDDDD
|colspan=9|
|-

|-bgcolor=#DDDDDD
|colspan=9|
|-

|-bgcolor=#DDDDDD
|colspan=9|
|-

Women

|-bgcolor=#DDDDDD
|colspan=9|
|-

|-bgcolor=#DDDDDD
|colspan=9|
|-

|-bgcolor=#DDDDDD
|colspan=9|
|-

|-bgcolor=#DDDDDD
|colspan=9|
|-

|-bgcolor=#DDDDDD
|colspan=9|
|-

Mixed relay

Short course (25m)

Men

|-bgcolor=#DDDDDD
|colspan=9|
|-

|-bgcolor=#DDDDDD
|colspan=9|
|-

|-bgcolor=#DDDDDD
|colspan=9|
|-

|-bgcolor=#DDDDDD
|colspan=9|
|-

|-bgcolor=#DDDDDD
|colspan=9|
|-

Women

|-bgcolor=#DDDDDD
|colspan=9|
|-

|-bgcolor=#DDDDDD
|colspan=9|
|-

|-bgcolor=#DDDDDD
|colspan=9|
|-

|-bgcolor=#DDDDDD
|colspan=9|
|-

|-bgcolor=#DDDDDD
|colspan=9|
|-

Mixed relay

References
General
Bolivian Long Course Records 4 January 2023 updated
Bolivian Short Course Records 4 January 2023 updated
Specific

External links
FEBONA official web site

Records
Bolivian
Swimming